Sulutyube is a rural locality (a selo) in Karasuvsky Selsoviet, Nogaysky District, Republic of Dagestan, Russia. The population was 49 as of 2010. There are 2 streets.

Geography 
It is located 5 km southwest of Terekli-Mekteb.

Nationalities 
Nogais live there.

Famous residents 
 Kadyr Sabutov (Hero of Socialist Labor)
 Kamov Sabutov (Hero of Socialist Labor)

References 

Rural localities in Nogaysky District, Dagestan